Below are the results of the second season of the United Kingdom & Ireland Poker Tour (UKIPT).  Currency amounts are in Euro or Pounds Sterling as stated.

Results

UKIPT Galway
 Venue: Radisson Blu Hotel
 Buy-in: €1,100
 4-Day Event: December 3–5, 2010
 Number of buy-ins: 266
 Total Prize Pool: €266,000
 Number of Payouts: 32

UKIPT Nottingham
 Venue: Dusk Till Dawn
 Buy-in: £500
 4-Day Event: February 11–14, 2011
 Number of buy-ins: 1058
 Total Prize Pool: £529,000
 Number of Payouts: 128

UKIPT Manchester
 Venue: G Casino, Manchester
 Buy-in: £500
 4-Day Event: March 10–14, 2011
 Number of buy-ins: 615
 Total Prize Pool: £307,500
 Number of Payouts: 81

UKIPT Cork
 Venue: Rochestown Park Hotel
 Buy-in: €500
 4-Day Event: May 19–22, 2011
 Number of buy-ins: 602
 Total Prize Pool: €291,970
 Number of Payouts: 82

UKIPT Newcastle
 Venue: Aspers Casino, Newcastle
 Buy-in: £500
 4-Day Event: June 16–19, 2011
 Number of buy-ins: 554
 Total Prize Pool: £277,000
 Number of Payouts: 72

UKIPT Brighton
 Venue: Hilton Metropole Hotel, Brighton
 Buy-in: £500
 4-Day Event: July 14–17, 2011
 Number of buy-ins: 603
 Total Prize Pool: £292,455
 Number of Payouts: 81

UKIPT Edinburgh
 Venue: The Corn Exchange, Edinburgh
 Buy-in: £500
 4-Day Event: August 11–14, 2011
 Number of buy-ins: 519
 Total Prize Pool: £259,500
 Number of Payouts: 63

UKIPT Dublin
 Venue: Ballsbridge Inn, Dublin
 Buy-in: £500
 5-Day Event: September 8–12, 2011
 Number of buy-ins: 718
 Total Prize Pool: €348,230
 Number of Payouts: 90

UKIPT London
 Venue: Hilton London Metropole Hotel, London
 Buy-in: £5,000
 7-Day Event: September 30-October 6, 2011
 Number of buy-ins: 691
 Total Prize Pool: £3,351,350
 Number of Payouts: 104

Notes 

UK and Ireland Poker Tour
2010 in Irish sport
2010 in British sport
2010 in poker